The McKay Trading Estate in Slough, Berkshire, is a grade II listed building with Historic England. It was completed in 1976–78, for the architect John Outram.

References

External links 
 

Grade II listed commercial buildings
Grade II listed buildings in Berkshire
Buildings and structures in Slough